The 20+ ton was a sailing event on the Sailing at the 1900 Summer Olympics program in Le Havre. The race was planned for August 2, 1900. However, as result of the storm that was unleashed on the port and the poor condition of the sea the race was postponed to Sunday August 3, 1900. 14 boats, from 4 nations registered for the competition. Due to the weather conditions only four of them started and finished the race. Originally this race was not a part of the Olympic competition but was part of the l’Exposition universelle. Later it was incorporated in the Olympic history.

Race schedule

Course area and course configuration 
For the 20+ ton the  course off the coast of Le Havre was used.

Weather conditions

Final results 
The 1900 Olympic scoring system was used. Handicaps were added to each boat's actual time to give a total adjusted time.

Notes 
In the second round, Formosa, which was ahead of its competitors, had its spinnaker gone in a burst, which was significant set back.

Other information 
The races drew a considerable number of spectators and yachts to watch the races in Le Havre. The harbour was packed with different tonnage vessels. Offshore the Fleurus, Cassini, and Mangini destroyers were present. Most of the members of the international jury followed the races aboard the Almee, a yacht owned by Henri Menier.

Further reading

References 

20+ ton
Ton class